Santacruz or Santa Cruz (Pronunciation: [saːn̪t̪akɾuːz]) is a suburb of Mumbai. The Santacruz railway station on the Mumbai Suburban Railway, the domestic terminal (T1) of the Chhatrapati Shivaji Maharaj International Airport, and one campus of the University of Mumbai, are all located in Santacruz (East).

Santacruz and its neighbouring suburb Khar fall under the H East and H West wards of the Municipal Corporation of Greater Mumbai. The locality had a population of 675,951 in 1991, over an area of 12.98 square kilometers, giving it a population density of 36,668 persons per square kilometer.

History
The term Santa Cruz comes from the Portuguese words meaning "Holy Cross", a reference to a 150-year-old Cross located on Chapel lane within the compound of a home for destitute women run by Mother Teresa's Missionaries of Charity trust. That name was also given to a church that existed on a site on the western side of the railway station along the current Swami Vivekanand Road, presently occupied by the Sacred Heart Boys High School and Sacred Heart Church. This original church was destroyed by the Marathas during their conquest of the Salsette Island from Portugal. When the railways began operations in October 1888, the local railway station was named after the Holy Cross, and Santacruz as a locality came into being.

The then British Government set up RAF Santacruz, a military airfield, in 1942. It was home to several RAF squadrons during World War II from 1942 to 1947. The airfield was transferred to the Indian Government for civilian use upon Independence, and came to be known as Santa Cruz airport, the city's main airport. Construction of a new passenger terminal and apron began in 1950 and was commissioned in 1958. In the 1980s, a new international terminal was built at Sahar, to cater for the increasing number of passenger movements and types of aircraft; the terminal at Santa Cruz was converted to serve domestic flights and was primarily used by Indian Airlines until the 1990s, when Jet Airways and East West Airlines appeared. The original terminal building still exists and has been given a new façade and host of interior upgrades. A second terminal complex has also been built to supplement existing facilities.

Geography
Santa Cruz is bordered by Juhu and Vile Parle to the north and Khar and Bandra to the south. It is broadly divided in two areas: Santa Cruz (East) and Santa Cruz (West) by the Mumbai Suburban Railway line. The Milan Subway and Khar Subway connect the two areas, passing under the rail line. Recently Milan flyover has been built which has improved connectivity between Santacruz East and West. The Western express highway passes through Santacruz East. Because of its unique geography and connectivity, Santacruz is one of the prime locations in Mumbai.

MMRDA has built a Skywalk for pedestrians stretching from Podar School Complex (West Santa Cruz) to  Western Express Highway (East Santa Cruz).

Santacruz (East)
Santa Cruz (East) consists of Maratha Colony, Prabhat Colony, Agripada, Kalina and Vakola. It also consists of land belonging Airport Authority of India, which consists of the Mumbai Airport and Air India Colony (which comes in Kalina).

The main roads passing through Santa Cruz (E) are the Western Express Highway, Nehru Road, Santacruz-Chembur Link Road and the Kalina-Kurla Link Road. The PIN codes of this area are 400055, 400029 and 400098.

Dawri Nagar
Located near Western Express Highway is the site of Sai Baba Temple which is at the centre of the area where many devotees come to pray daily. Baba Mandir is made of marble and seashells. On The Festival of Ramnavmi Utsav more than 10–20,000 people have visited on this day since 1992. The temple has been located at Achanak Krida Mandel / Siddhi Sai Seva Mandal.

Vakola
Vakola stretches from the Western Express Highway to the Kalina Military Camp in the east. One of the interesting facts is that the oldest Sindhi colony Aaram Society was inaugurated by India's first prime minister Jawaharlal Nehru in the year 1954 for the refugees who had escaped from Pakistan at 1947 still exists.  Yashwant nagar, Dawri Nagar, Nagdevi Nagar, Vakola Bridge, Dhobighat, Shivaji Nagar, Datta Mandir, Vakola Pipeline, Vakola Village , Ramabai wadi, kadam wadi and Vakola Masjid areas form most of Vakola, densely populated by Hindus, Muslims, Buddhists, Catholics and Jains. These communities, though tending to cluster together, live in relative harmony with each other, however, the area of Vakola was among the worst affected during the Bombay riots of 1993 And during 2006 dalits protests in maharashtra and the violent reaction of dalits in 3 January 2018 band after 2018 bhimakoregaon violence and is called hot bed of Dalit militancy 

Vakola village is home to one of the indigenous communities of Mumbai, the East Indians. Formerly known as Vankola for three centuries, the village formed part of the Kalina Parish which was founded in 1606. It was in 1914 that through the initiative of Fr. C. A. Abreo at Kalina Church, that a chapel was contemplated to be built at Vankola. Mr. John 'Jamboo' Rodrigues donated the land, and the chapel was finally completed and dedicated to St. Anthony and blessed on 1 January 1921. Practically all the villagers then had relatives (brothers, sisters, in-laws) either at Kalliana (now Kalina) or at Vile Parle. The Church was remodeled in 1977 to suit the changed liturgical norms. Today, St. Anthony's Church is one of the largest parishes in the Archdiocese of Mumbai in terms of the Catholic population, which is estimated to include around 23,000 persons.

To the south of the Vankola village were a few fields and marshy lands reaching right up to the Mithi River at Bandra East that contained a lot of wildlife, birds of all kinds and small animals. Vankola village being on a small rise, the land sloped downwards towards the marshes. All social activity of the people was centered at Kalina Village which was connected to Vakola by a small road skirting the Rye Hills which now houses the Military Camp. This small road is still in use and is used a short cut to Kalina.

Anand Nagar is a large development built as transit accommodation for Post-Partition refugees, but subsequently leased out and sold to various families.

Vakola has two schools run by the Catholic Church, St Anthony's Boys' School and St. Charles Girls' School. Other educational institutions include The Patuck School and College Complex – founded under the Patuck Polytechnic Trust by the Late Mr. Rustomji Hormusji Patuck, a Parsi businessman turned technical educationist, The New Model English High School, The Municipal School at Vakola Bridge that includes several upper and lower primary schools in Hindi, Marathi, Urdu, Gujarati, Kannada, Telugu mediums and The Nariyalwadi Municipal school that has upper and primary schools in Hindi, Marathi and Tamil mediums And The Public High School & College.

Vakola hosts the corporate headquarters of Asian Paints Limited and a significant number of large commercial banks, including Canara Bank, State Bank of India, The Shamrao Vithal Co-operative Bank (Head Office in Vakola), CitizenCredit Co-operative Bank, Bank of Baroda, Central Bank of India, ICICI Bank, Axis Bank and NKGSB Co-Operative Bank . The Grand Hyatt hotel is located at Vakola, on the erstwhile premises of the Standard Batteries factory. Vakola is also famous for its marble stretch which exists on the Nehru Road till the Western Express Highway. The Domestic Terminal 1 and International Terminal 2 of Mumbai Airport lie 10 mins and 20 mins away respectively from Vakola. The prominent upscale commercial, business and residential district of Bandra Kurla Complex lies neighboring the Vakola and Kalina region. 

The road stretching from the Western Express Highway to the Military Camp is called Nehru Road.
A tributary of the Mithi River, called as the Vakola Nallah flows through Vakola. This river overflowed during the statewide floods of 2005 on 26 July 2005 and caused massive damage to slums and housing societies along its banks. Some buildings were under ten feet of water.

The neighbourhood of Vakola is the setting for the 2011 novel Last Man in Tower, by Booker Prize–winning Indian author Aravind Adiga.

Agripada
Agripada stretches from the Domestic Airport to Chakki Khan. It is densely populated with many slums. It is also connected to the Western Express Highway directly.
It also has a subway named "Aliyavar Jung Marg" which connects it to "Prabhat Colony". It has various general stores, chemists and few health clinics for the people living in the locality. One of the place's uniqueness is that you can see airplanes taking off and landing very closely. It also has the "Mithi Nadi", the River that flows from Santacruz to Bandra.

Kalina
The East Indian village of Kole-Kalyan, now known as Kalina (from the original name Kalliana), lay on the eastern side of a forested hillock called The Rye, a mile and half southeast of Vile Parle. The words Kole-Kalyan mean the homes of jackals, foxes and wolves which at one time roamed freely in large numbers in this area. The people of the village gathered their firewood, berries and Fruits from the Hill that gave a panoramic view of the Arabian Sea and the creeks, marshy lagoons, lowlands and coconut groves of Juhu in the west, the Sion Hill and Fort, Mahim, and the Mithi River flowing to the sea at Bandra in the South, the hillocks of Chakala and Bamanwada, the small hamlet of Sahar and the Marol hills and forests to the North and the village of Kurla and the Western Ghats in the east.

The British saw the importance of this hill and promptly put up a military base with training facilities for soldiers and rest houses for the Officers and fully equipped medical facilities. Today the hill and its military base (called Kalina camp) still stand well maintained, untouched by slums and housing societies, buildings and projects.

The Village was divided into sections like, Bhatt Pakady, Matharpakady, Corderio Wadi, Desachi Pakadi and Ranwar Pakadi, and the other village of Kolavree across the southeast. The Parish Church of Our Lady of Egypt sat beside the large freshwater lake, which was used by the villages for washing clothes. Sweet drinking water was obtained from numerous wells in the villages. The main occupation of the people was agriculture. With British setting up their military base on the hill, many of the local people got employment.

In April 1930, The Kole-Kalyan Death Benefit Fund was inaugurated, presided over by Mr. Avelino Miranda at its first meeting who outlined the aims of the Benefit Fund as to render monetary assistance to the poor and needy of the two villages at the time of Funerals. The Callina Catholic Association established in 1923, won fame and popularity in both cricket and hockey.

The Government acquired the vegetable fields to the north of Kalina village from the villagers in the early 1950s. They paid a pittance as compensation to the villagers at four annas per square yard. It was a forced 'take it or get nothing' situation. This land is occupied by large apartment complexes belonging to the government-owned airline, i.e., Air-India colony and Indian Airlines colony.

The village of Kalina had doubled and tripled in size by the mushrooming of buildings and slums, huts and shanties illegally built on the east, hugging the Rye Hill and spilling onto the now defunct railway line. The village is practically strangulated and overrun by slums like Jamblipada and Kunchi Kurve Nagar mainly because the ruling politicians failed to maintain the East Indian Villages as heritage properties.

Kalina has undergone high growth in recent years. The area lies midway between two suburban stations of Kurla and Santa Cruz, which are on the Central and Western Railway Lines respectively. It is also close to the Bandra-Kurla complex and only 15 minutes from the domestic terminals of the Chatrapati Shivaji International Airport. Kalina is also an emerging hub for commercial real estate and private companies with big names such as Microsoft, Rolls-Royce (Marine Engines), Mudra Communication setting up shop there. The proposed Mumbai Police Headquarters will be in Kalina. The Directorate Of Forensic Science Laboratories (Govt. of Maha. Mumbai headquarters), The Directorate of Maharashtra Fire Services (Mumbai Headquarters) and the Police Training Quarters are all located in the Kole-Kalyan (Kolivery) village in the Kalina region. The Santa Cruz-Chembur link road will run through Kalina as part of the Mumbai Urban Transport Project.

The Church of Our Lady of Egypt was built in 1606 and the Parish consisted of the following villages under its jurisdiction: – Kole-kalyan, Aldeia, Sur, Sar, Naugar, Vancolem and Cuddy as of 1761 (Humbert I : 223–238). According to Fr. Paulo da Trindade, the church and the parish was founded when Fr. Antonio da Portiuncula was Custos (1606–1609) and Fr. Manoel de S. Mathias, a great missionary baptized more than a thousand souls. The church is one of the very few churches that escaped ruthless destruction and pillage at the hands of the Marathas during the invasion and occupation of 1739, after which secular priests started functioning at the Church of Kalina. In the late 1960s, the Church was enlarged and renovated due to an increase in the Catholic population. On either side of the main altar, large wings were added to accommodate about 200 people. The main structure is still intact, except the Porch that was redesigned and made larger. A new graveyard was added to the north of the church as the old one became insufficient, as the people from Vakola parish have also to be buried here. The church celebrated its 400th centenary in 2006.

The Ganesh Temple is the oldest temple in Kalina and provides yeoman service to residents of Kalina. Thousands of devotees make a pilgrimage here, thus making it an important event in the Kalina calendar. The South Indian Temple named "Vigneshwar" is located in Sunder Nagar, a large residential area consisting of row houses. It has become a magnet for tourists from all over Mumbai due to its award-winning design. Kalina also has five mosques.

Kalina is home to a number of schools and colleges besides the Kalina Campus of the University of Mumbai and the prestigious Bombay College of Pharmacy India. The Saint Mary's School had its origin as far back as 1876 and was known as The Little Portuguese School when Fr. Custodio Fernandes was the Vicar. The school came into prominence around the year 1912; The number of students increased from 130 to 180 and a temporary structure was built in 1914 to accommodate the growing number. The only problem was that the villagers were not willing to pay any fees and hence the Diocese of Daman and the Bombay Catholic Welfare Organization had to render financial help. By now most well-off families sent their children to school in Bandra, the girls at St. Joseph Convent and the boys at St. Stanislaus and St. Andrews. The children had no transport facilities in those days and would walk the distance daily. In 1936 Archbishop of Bombay took a special interest, and seeing that there was an urgent need for a good building made a substantial gift of Rs. 7000/- and with the efforts of the Vicar and his assistant they managed to get a subscription of Rs. 1100/- from the public. The Foundation stone was laid by Mr. Katrak, the manager of the Kurla Estate. The new building had four large well-ventilated rooms and could accommodate 200 pupils. The strength of the school in 1937 was now 247 pupils, the principal now was Fr. P. Pereira who deserves credit for his able management of the school. Today the school is not only a high school but also a junior college.

Other notable schools in the vicinity are Mary Immaculate High School, a school run by sisters of Ajmer, the Kalina Education Society School, which was set up by the late M.L.A, Mr. Hans Bhugra and Air India Modern School. Shops and restaurants which are renowned in Kalina are "Geeta vihar restaurant" ,"Natural ice cream store" and "Monginese cake shop". It is considered a good place for startup for foodies e.g. "stella" 
During the statewide floods in 2005, Air India Colony was flooded with water five to six metres deep. In many buildings, the water had entered in the ground floor and first floor level houses and the people had to take shelter on the upper floors. Rescue boats of Navy were requisitioned deployed in the area. Immediately after the deluge, restoration programme was implemented and portable pumps were installed at Air India colony, helping the early discharge of flood water.

A prominent "I Love Kalina" sign proudly marks this location, standing in the busy junction known as Kalina Signal.

Santacruz (West)

Santa Cruz (West) is strikingly more affluent than the eastern part of the suburb. It is bordered by Khar, Bandra, Juhu and Vile Parle.

It is primarily a residential area, with the market situated near the railway station. The residential colonies include such as 1st & 2nd Gauthan Lane [East Indians Village] (where the original inhabitants of Santacruz and Mumbai resided there) Amar Subway Society, the Reserve Bank of India Quarters, Vithaldas Nagar Colony, Sangeeta Apartments, Shree Sai Darshan CHS, Girnar CHS, Rizvi Park, Bansraj Singh Estate, Khotwadi, Bhimwada, T.P.S. 6th Residential colony Ramas Plaza, Khira Nagar and NABARD Park, Shastri Nagar, Jeevan Sona society, Bhagwati Society, Main Avenue, Convent Avenue, St. Joseph's Avenue, St. Francis Avenue & Church Avenue, Juhu Koliwada. Indira Nagar, Shivaji nagar, Chandra Bai nagar, Anand nagar are the densely populated area near Kishore Kumar Bungalow named after him. In the past, most of the residences used to be small bungalows, which are now being replaced by high-rise buildings.

It also has Famous Sadhana School which Produced Great Film Musician like Anu Malik. Raheja's Educational complex has many institutions. The SNDT, the women University is in the area, a new entrance has been opened towards Raheja college Road. The St. Lawrence High School is also one of the oldest schools located just adjacent to the Saraswat Colony. The Juhu's aeroplane garden is frequented by both children and the elderly.

The main roads in Santa Cruz (W) are Swami Vivekanand Road, Juhu Road, Juhu Tara Road, KKG marg and Linking Road (now officially called Vithalbhai Patel Marg). PIN code for Santa Cruz (west) are 400054 and 400049. The Bungalow of Famous Singer Kishor Kumar is on Juhu Tara Road, just behind Little Italy Cafe.

Willingdon Colony
The Bombay Catholic Cooperative Housing Society constructed in 1930 a low-cost housing estate for the Catholic community, known as Willingdon Colony. It included pre-existing bungalows that the Cooperative had built as early as 1917. The members of the cooperative voted in 1966 to redevelop the colony, with 673 new flats to be built. The redevelopment was planned to provide permanent accommodation for 230 members, with the excess flats to be offered for sale. An additional, separate, building on the land was to provide capacity to temporarily house a further 530 people displaced by slum redevelopments, through the Slum Rehabilitation Authority. A small number of cooperative members opposed the redevelopment, and it was delayed by litigation for nearly 50 years. 

Despite heritage preservation concerns, and over the objections of the twenty remaining resident families, their final challenge was dismissed by the Supreme Court in 2014, allowing redevelopment to proceed. Demolition of historic bungalows commenced soon after. Further pauses occurred throughout 2014, as stays for proceedings continued. Despite the court's rejection of the challenge to redevelopment, the same group began a new round of legal actions in 2015, with a petition to the High Court, challenging the validity of the permit issued to the developer to transplant 103 trees from the site. The petitioners were not successful in having the tree removal permit withdrawn.

Saraswat Colony
The old neighbourhood belonging to the Saraswat Brahmins is one of the most beautiful neighbourhoods in Mumbai with its private gardens, a private playground and pebbled walkways. The colony has more than 15 buildings and now consists of members that belong to various communities. The Bhramakumari Garden is located close to the colony.

Hasnabad Lane
Known for its immersive shopping experiences, Hasnabad Lane is one of the most visited and loved areas of Santacruz West. It is divided into 1st Hasnabad (only a residential area) and 2nd Hasnabad (residential and commercial). Hasnabad Lane is often crowded with shoppers during festivals such as Diwali, Eid, and Christmas.

Government institutions
Postal Services
 Santacruz (West) Post Office: Located on Linking Road, adjacent to St. Lawrence High School. Great post office for normal and simple things, but impossible to do more complex stuff like Franking.
 Vakola Post Office
 Kalina Post Office: Located on Vidyanagri Road, outside the University of Mumbai Campus
 Air-India Post Office: Located in Air-India Colony
 Santacruz East Post Office: Located next to the overhead Pedestrian Bridge of the Santacruz train station

Police Stations
 Santacruz (West) Police Station: Located on the intersection of Juhu Road and Linking Road, opposite Lion's Park.
 Vakola Police Station: Located at the intersection of Nehru Road and the Western Express Highway, on the Vakola side of the flyover

Other
 BEST Bus Depot, Santacruz (West): Located on Swami Vivekanand Road near Milan Subway (after the intersection of Juhu Road and Swami Vivekanand Road).
 BEST Bus Station, Santacruz (East): Located near the station, in Santacruz (East).
 MTNL Office: Located inside the BSNL Campus on Juhu Road
 Military Camp: It is a camp of the Indian Army Air Defense Regiment.
 Santacruz Airport Domestic and Runway For International Airport
 Juhu Aerodrome
 Maharashtra Fire Services Academy
 LIC office located opposite to the BEST bus depot near Milan Subway

Amenities and places of interest

Cultural
 Ramakrishna Mission (though strictly in Khar) has a yearly fest between October (for the Durga Puja festival) and December. It is widely attended for its mix of eclectic stalls selling cultural wares, clothes, religious and spiritual books, devotional music and eateries. The food stalls outside the hospital are famous in Mumbai for Chaat
 The Yoga Institute (TYI), founded in 1918, is widely reported to be the oldest organised yoga center in the world. It was the first  to offer courses to men, women and children of any caste or creed, for free.  Initially located at Versova, Bombay, its permanent home was established at Santacruz in 1948. TYI's founder, Shri Yogendra (1897–1989), played a key role in developing medical hatha yoga, a step in the history of yoga that would later lead to the development of Yoga therapy.

Education

University campuses
 SNDT Women's University, with Juhu campus on the Juhu Tara Road, which houses approximately 15 institutions, mostly for Postgraduate programmes; 
 has over ten colleges, including: 
 SVT College of Home Science, 
 PV Polytechnic, 
 C U Shah College of Pharmacy and 
 Usha Mittal Institute of Technology. 
 Women graduates can enroll for MA and MSc as well as MBA and MCAs on this campus. The University headquarters are at Churchgate and it has campus at Pune
 The Kalina Campus of the University of Mumbai

Schools
 * Smt. Lilavatibai Podar High School, Santacruz West: an ICSE board School till 12th standard.
 St. Anthony High School, Nehru Road, Vakola, Santacruz (East): for boys from preschool to Standard-X levels; named 'high school' even though it also offers primary and pre-primary education 
 St. Anthony Girls' High School, St. Anthony's Road, Chembur (West)
 Billabong High International School, Santacruz West, a coeducational school from pre-primary to class 12, offering  (Cambridge) curriculum
 St. Charles High School (for girls) Vakola, Santacruz (East) 
 Little Angels English High School, Santacruz (West)
 St. Mary's High School, Kalina
 R. N. Podar School, a -board school offering education from junior kindergarten to class 12.
 Rameshwar Vidyamandir Secondary School Datta Mandir, Vakola, Santacruz (East)
 St Teresa's Convent High School, Swami Vivekanand Road, Willingdon, Santacruz (West),  education, from pre-primary level to class XII
 Taraben master english secandry school

Parks and gardens
 Juhu Garden, Juhu-Tara Road, Santacruz (West), known for its large-scale aircraft replica in the children's playground, and consequently popularly called the "Aeroplane Garden". The original version, a concrete replica of a Boeing 707-437 was donated by Air India in the 1960s, and generations of local children played in its cabin and "cockpit". Its partial collapse in 2009 was the cause of a fatality, after which public access was closed; its demolition followed in 2011. A replacement version was installed and opened to the public in 2013.
 Muktanand Park – off the linking road
 Rotary Park (also known as Rajesh Khanna Park)

General facilities
 Five Star Hotels like Grand Hyatt; Taj-Santacruz
 Willingdon Gymkhana – a club with facilities like swimming, tennis, gymnasium and similar
 Gold Cinemas, located inside Milan mall (now closed, only theatre is functional), Santacruz (West)

Churches, temples, religious sites
 Sacred Heart Church, Santacruz (West)
 Sai Baba Mandir, Dawri Nagar,  Santacruz (East) – temple
 St. Anthony's Church, Vakola, Santacruz (East)
 Gurudwara Guru Nanak Satsang, Santacruz (East), Kalina – centre for Sikh worship 
 Hare Ram Hare Krishna Iskcon Temple
 Our Lady of Egypt Church, Kalina
 Shree Gurudev Datta Mandir, Datta Mandir Road, Vakola – temple, established 1924
 Muslim Majlis Trust (Kabrastan Masjid) Opp.Santacruz Police Station

Hospitals
 Santa Cruz General Hospital SV Road, 
 Nanavati Hospital
 Surya Hospitals, S.V. Road

References

Mumbai Suburban district
Suburbs of Mumbai